Lot-et-Garonne is a department in the Nouvelle-Aquitaine region of Southwestern France. Named after the rivers Lot and Garonne, it had a population of 331,271 in 2019. Its prefecture and largest city is Agen.

History
Lot-et-Garonne is one of the original 83 departments created on 4 March 1790, as a result of the French Revolution. It was created from part of the province of Guyenne and Gascony; originally the territory of the ancient county of Agenais constituted nearly the whole.

The southeastern part of the original department (the former cantons of Auvillar, Montaigu-de-Quercy and Valence) was separated from it in 1808 to become a part of the newly created department of Tarn-et-Garonne.

Geography

Lot-et-Garonne is part of the current region of Nouvelle-Aquitaine and is surrounded by the departments of Lot, Tarn-et-Garonne, Gers, Landes, Gironde, and Dordogne.
The north of the department is composed of limestone hills. Between Lot and Garonne, there is a plateau carved by many valleys. In the west of the department, the Landes forest is planted in sand. It's composed of maritime pines. Between the forest and Agen, there is the Albret, a very hilly country.

Principal towns

The most populous commune is Agen, the prefecture. As of 2019, there are 5 communes with more than 7,000 inhabitants:

Demographics
The inhabitants of the department are called Lot-et-Garonnais.

Population development since 1801:

Politics

Departmental Council of Lot-et-Garonne
The Departmental Council of Lot-et-Garonne has 40 seats. In the 2015 departmental elections, the Socialist Party (PS) secured 25 seats while The Republicans (LR) won 15 seats. Sophie Borderie (PS) has presided over the assembly since 2019.

Members of the National Assembly
Lot-et-Garonne elected the following members of the National Assembly during the 2017 legislative election:

Economy
Food-processing, chemicals, and pharmaceuticals are all major industries of the department.

Tourism

See also
Cantons of the Lot-et-Garonne department
Communes of the Lot-et-Garonne department
Arrondissements of the Lot-et-Garonne department
Roman Catholic Diocese of Agen

References

External links

  Prefecture website
  Departmental Council website

  
  Chamber of Commerce and Industry website

 
1790 establishments in France
Departments of Nouvelle-Aquitaine
States and territories established in 1790